An Inheritance of Ashes is a 2015 young adult fantasy novel by Leah Bobet. It was published by Clarion Books.

Synopsis
In the aftermath of the victorious war against the Wicked God Southward, sisters Hallie and Marthe wait for Marthe's husband Thom to return to their farm. As the weeks go by and Thom does not return, Things start to roam the countryside, and Hallie realizes that the Wicked God's defeat may not have been as conclusive as everyone thought.

Reception
An Inheritance of Ashes won the 2016 Aurora Award for Young Adult Fiction and Sunburst Award for Young Adult Fiction.

Publishers Weekly felt it was "superb", commending Bobet as "an accomplished stylist". 
Quill & Quire considered it to be an "odd but remarkable story" and "touching yet eerie", describing the setting as "beautiful and barely comprehensible" and Hallie's narration as "reflective (and) poetic". Kirkus Reviews likewise noted that Hallie's narration had "an overabundance of poetic but lofty metaphors and similes", but conceded that the story had a "deep and sobering core".

Black Gate considered it to have "the darkness and intensity of an adult novel", with "masterfully subtle (...) writing" and characters who are "full of surprises". Tor.com called it "remarkably good", praising Bobet for balancing "the coming-of-age narrative and the broader story of the world", and lauding her portrayal of complex characters and the relationships between them.

References

Young adult fantasy novels
2015 fantasy novels
Canadian fantasy novels
2015 Canadian novels
Clarion Books books